The spotwing flying gurnard (Dactyloptena macracantha) is an unusual looking fish because of its huge pectoral fins. The fish has dark spots and wavy lines on the fins. It has a dull head and a grey or sometimes brown body that is covered with dark brown or black spots.

Despite its name, the spotwing flying gurnard is not related to the true flyingfish; these are in the family Exocoetidae, order Beloniformes.  Nor is it able to fly, or even to glide as the true flyingfish do.

This fish can grow to 38 cm in length. They feed on crustaceans, clams and small fishes. They have feeler-like leading rays and extensions from each fin ray. When this fish is disturbed, it quickly expands its pectoral fins, often retracting them before swimming off at speed.  Although the Flying Gurnard does not fly, it can "walk" on the bottom by alternatively moving its pelvic fins and short pectoral fin rays.

This is an Indo-Pacific species which occurs from the northern Indian Ocean to Japan.

References

External links
 

spotwing flying gurnard
Marine fish of Northern Australia
Taxa named by Pieter Bleeker
spotwing flying gurnard